Glendora Unified School District is a public school district based in Glendora, Los Angeles County, California, United States.
 
The school district covers northern and central Glendora. The school board is composed of five members, at-large, elected to a four-year term. The elections are currently held on a Tuesday after the first Monday in November of odd-numbered years until the 2017 election, then they will switch to even-numbered years starting with the November 2020 election to coincide with the California General Election.

Schools
Elementary Schools (K–5)

 Cullen Elementary Schooll
 La Fetra Elementary School
 Sellers Elementary School
 Stanton Elementary School
 Sutherland Elementary School
Middle Schools (6–8)

 Goddard Middle School
 Sandburg Middle School
High Schools (9–12)

 Glendora High School
 Whitcomb High School
Adult Schools (Adults)

 Glendora Adult School

References

External links
 

School districts in Los Angeles County, California